Luženičky is a municipality and village in Domažlice District in the Plzeň Region of the Czech Republic. It has about 400 inhabitants.

Administrative parts
The village of Luženice is an administrative part of Luženičky.

References

Villages in Domažlice District